Dyspyralis nigellus, the slaty dyspyralis moth, is a species of moth in the family Erebidae. It is found in North America.

The MONA or Hodges number for Dyspyralis nigellus is 8428.

References

Further reading

 
 
 

Hypenodinae
Articles created by Qbugbot
Moths described in 1900